Crawfurdia is a genus of flowering plants belonging to the family Gentianaceae.

Its native range is Eastern Himalaya to China.

Species:

Crawfurdia angustata 
Crawfurdia arunachalensis 
Crawfurdia bomareoides 
Crawfurdia campanulacea 
Crawfurdia championii 
Crawfurdia crawfurdioides 
Crawfurdia delavayi 
Crawfurdia dimidiata 
Crawfurdia gracilipes 
Crawfurdia lobatilimba 
Crawfurdia maculaticaulis 
Crawfurdia nyingchiensis 
Crawfurdia poilanei 
Crawfurdia pricei 
Crawfurdia puberula 
Crawfurdia semialata 
Crawfurdia sessiliflora 
Crawfurdia sinkuensis 
Crawfurdia speciosa 
Crawfurdia thibetica 
Crawfurdia tonkinensis 
Crawfurdia tsangshanensis

References

Gentianaceae
Gentianaceae genera